Starrcade '87: Chi-Town Heat was the fifth annual Starrcade professional wrestling supercard event produced by Jim Crockett Promotions (JCP) under the National Wrestling Alliance (NWA) banner. It took place on November 26, 1987, from the UIC Pavilion in Chicago, Illinois. It was the first NWA event to be broadcast live on pay-per-view, and was also shown on closed circuit narrowcast at 100 different venues, as previous supercards had. This was the first major JCP event to feature wrestlers from the Universal Wrestling Federation, which was purchased by JCP shortly before the event.

The event had a secondary theme, "Glory Bound", referring to Ron Garvin's quest for glory as NWA World Heavyweight Champion.

The main event was a steel cage match between Ric Flair and Ron Garvin for the NWA World Heavyweight Championship. After the event, Flair feuded with Sting. The event also included a steel cage match between Dusty Rhodes and Lex Luger for the NWA United States Heavyweight Championship, a match between The Road Warriors and the team of Arn Anderson and Tully Blanchard for the NWA World Tag Team Championship, and a match between Nikita Koloff and Terry Taylor to unify the NWA World Television Championship and the UWF World Television Championship.

In 2014, the WWE Network included the previous Starrcades (1983–1986), which had been transmitted via closed-circuit television, alongside the rest of the Starrcades in the pay-per-view section.

Storylines

The event involved wrestlers from pre-existing scripted feuds and storylines. Wrestlers portrayed villains, heroes, or less distinguishable characters in the scripted events that built tension and culminated in a wrestling match or series of matches.

Starrcade was headlined by the match between Ric Flair and Ron Garvin for the NWA World Heavyweight Championship. The booking committee wanted to end Flair's reign as the champion, but their top preferences of whom to be the new champion could not be chosen due to the circumstances. Garvin was chosen instead, and he defeated Flair to win the title on September 25. He was not well accepted as the champion by fans.

Jim Crockett Promotions had previously aired Starrcade only on closed-circuit television while the World Wrestling Federation (WWF), a competitor, had started to air events on pay-per-view in 1985 with WrestleMania, and was very successful. The 1987 Starrcade was the first pay-per-view event of the National Wrestling Alliance. To compete with Starrcade, the WWF introduced the Survivor Series event, and held it on the same night as Starrcade. The WWF also limited the amount of pay-per-view providers that would carry Starrcade by not allowing providers to carry WrestleMania IV if they did not carry Survivor Series exclusively. Only a small amount of providers carried Starrcade, and it drew a 3.30 buy rate while Survivor Series drew a 7.0 buy rate.

Event

The pay-per-view opened with Eddie Gilbert, Rick Steiner and Larry Zbyszko taking on Sting, Michael Hayes and Jimmy Garvin. Sting, Hayes, and Garvin had the early advantage until receiving a front powerslam from Zbysko, whose team dominated Garvin until Sting tagged in. Sting fought off Zbyszko, Gilbert and Steiner but Zbyszko rake his eyes. Sting was dominated until Hayes and Gilbert tagged in. All wrestlers came in, and Hayes, Sting, and Garvin performed mounted punches. Zbyszko, Gilbert and Steiner had the advantage after Gilbert performed an ax handle to Hayes. Hayes fought back with the small package on Gilbert. As Hayes had Gilbert in the sunset flip, the match ended in a time-limit draw.

Next, Steve Williams defended the UWF Heavyweight Championship against Barry Windham. The match went back and forth until Williams applied the side headlock. After breaking the hold, Williams attempted to jump over Windham, but Windham's head hit Williams's groin. Windham leaped at Williams but fell outside the ring, as Williams avoided his opponent. After Windham came back into the ring, Williams pinned Windham with an Oklahoma roll to win the match and retain the title.

The third match was a Skywalkers match between The Midnight Express (Bobby Eaton and Stan Lane) (accompanied by Jim Cornette and Big Bubba Rogers) and The Rock 'n' Roll Express (Ricky Morton and Robert Gibson). The match started with Rogers attacking Morton, as Gibson was double-teamed on the scaffold. Rogers attempted to climb the scaffold, but Morton attacked him, Lane and Eaton with Cornette's tennis racket. Eaton fought back by throwing powder at Morton and Gibson. The teams went back and forth until Lane climbed under the scaffold. Morton followed Lane and pushed him off. Morton and Gibson then attacked Eaton until he fell, and The Rock 'n' Roll Express won the match.

After this, NWA World Television Champion Nikita Koloff faced UWF World Television Champion Terry Taylor (accompanied by Eddie Gilbert) to unify the titles. The match started with Koloff targeting Taylor's left arm. Taylor gained the advantage by sending Koloff's head into the guard rail outside. Taylor then targeted Koloff's left arm and shoulder with the use of the ring post. Gilbert attacked Koloff's left knee with a steel chair, and Taylor applied the figure four leglock. After Taylor accidentally knocked Gilbert off the apron, Koloff performed a Russian Sickle, and pinned Taylor to unify the titles.

In the fifth match, Arn Anderson and Tully Blanchard defended the  NWA World Tag Team Championship against local favorites, The Road Warriors (Hawk and Animal). The Road Warriors had an early advantage. As Hawk had Blanchard in the gorilla press, Anderson attacked Hawk's left knee, which the champions continued to target with the use of the ring post and a chair. Anderson attempted a seated senton, but Hawk raised his knees and hit Anderson's groin. The Road Warriors regained the advantage, and Blanchard knocked referee Tommy Young outside the ring. Animal threw Anderson over the top rope with a back body drop. The Road Warriors then performed a Doomsday Device on Anderson, who was pinned by Animal, with replacement referee Earl Hebner counting the pin. However, the original referee reversed the decision and disqualified the Road Warriors for throwing Anderson over the top rope. Anderson and Blanchard won the match and retained the title.

Next, Lex Luger (accompanied by J. J. Dillon) defended the NWA United States Heavyweight Champions against Dusty Rhodes in a steel cage match. Johnny Weaver held the key to the cage. Rhodes would be suspended for 90 days if he lost. The match started back and forth until Luger sent Rhodes's head into the cage, and ground his head against it. Luger attacked Rhodes's left arm until Rhodes fought back and applied the sleeper hold. Dillon attacked Weaver with a chair and took the key. As the referee attempted to stop Dillon from unlocking the door, Luger ran into him, and Dillon threw in the chair. Luger attempted to pick it up, and Rhodes performed a DDT on the chair. Rhodes then pinned him to win the match and the title.

In the main event was Ron Garvin defended the NWA World Heavyweight Championship against Ric Flair. Garvin had the advantage with forehand chops, mounted punches and the Garvin Stomp. After they exchanged chops, Flair hit Garvin with a low blow and an inverted atomic drop. Flair targeted the left leg, hit a shin breaker and applied the figure four leglock. Garvin fought back after blocking Flair's attempts to send his head into the cage. Garvin hit Flair into the cage, applied a figure four leglock and performed a diving crossbody. Garvin punched Flair, who countered with an inverted atomic drop. Flair then reversed an Irish whip, sent Garvin's head into the cage, and pinned him to win the match and the title.

Aftermath
Ron Garvin's reign as the NWA World Heavyweight Champion had lasted for two months, and he never regained the title, then joined his brother Jimmy in a feud against Kevin Sullivan that ran until the Great American Bash 1988. Ric Flair remained the champion for over a year. In early 1988, Sting, who was rising to stardom, challenged Flair to a match at Clash of the Champions I. Flair accepted, and fought Sting for 45 minutes to a time-limit draw. The match made Sting a huge star. Sting continued to wrestle in many matches against Flair, as well as the other members of the Four Horsemen, and their rivalry continued for over ten years.  The Road Warriors continued to feud with the Four Horsemen through most of 1988.  

At the end of 1987, the UWF was closed and all its titles retired.  Lead UWF announcer Jim Ross joined the World Championship Wrestling announce team with Tony Schiavone and David Crockett on December 12, 1987.

Larry Zbyszko and Baby Doll became a team and went after Barry Windham's Western States Heritage title, which he won at the Bunkhouse Stampede in January 1988, then went after Dusty Rhodes' United States Heavyweight title in an angle where Baby Doll (formerly with Rhodes during 1986) had "incriminating photos" that she was going to use to force Rhodes to defend his title, but then Baby Doll was suddenly fired from JCP, possibly due to her then-husband Sam Houston wrestling for the WWF and JCP feared a potential conflict of interest, and the angle was scrapped.  Zbyszko would hold the Western States title until he went to the AWA at the beginning of 1989 (after JCP was sold to Ted Turner), the title was retired afterwards.

Nikita Koloff would go on to lose his NWA World TV Title to Mike Rotunda in January of 1988, then drop down the card as he began to lose interest in wrestling due to his then-wife Mandy's illness, appearing less and less on TV, until he finally took a sabbatical in November of 1988 to care for Mandy until her death in mid-1989.

Rhodes would retain his United States Heavyweight title until April, 1988, when he was stripped of the belt and suspended for 120 days after attacking NWA President Jim Crockett Jr. during an incident at a taping of World Championship Wrestling where Tully Blanchard assaulted Magnum T. A. and Rhodes came to his defense, wielding a baseball bat and hitting Blanchard with it repeatedly, then inadvertently hitting Crockett when he tried to intervene.  Lex Luger would be kicked out of the Horsemen after blaming J. J. Dillon for his losing the title, later he would team up with Barry Windham to capture the NWA World Tag Team titles, then Windham turned on Luger to join the Horsemen, capturing the vacant United States Heavyweight title in a tournament and feuding with his old mentor Rhodes.  Dusty Rhodes would never hold another NWA title after that.

The Road Warriors would move on to have a have a feud with manager Paul Jones' new team, the Powers of Pain (Warlord and Barbarian), during which Road Warrior Animal's orbital eye socket was injured during a "test of strength" weightlifting contest, which forced the Warriors and Dusty Rhodes to vacate their NWA World Six-Man Tag Team Championship, which was won by the Powers of Pain and Ivan Koloff.  The feud lasted until the beginning of the summer of 1988, when the Powers of Pain left for the WWF after refusing to lose a series of scaffold matches to the Warriors during the Great American Bash.

After Starrcade was outperformed by Survivor Series, Jim Crockett Promotions (JCP) and the World Wrestling Federation (WWF) continued to compete. When JCP held the Bunkhouse Stampede pay-per-view event in January 1988, the WWF held the Royal Rumble event, a television special, on the same night as Bunkhouse Stampede. In return, JCP held the first Clash of the Champions, also a television special, on the same night as WrestleMania IV. Clash of the Champions was a success, and drew a large cable rating.

Results

References

External links
Starrcade 1987 review at 411mania
Starrcade 1987 review at The Powerdriver Review

Starrcade
Professional wrestling in the Chicago metropolitan area
1980s in Chicago
1987 in Illinois
Events in Chicago
November 1987 events in the United States
1987 Jim Crockett Promotions pay-per-view events